The Cross Internacional de Soria, also known as the Campo a Través Internacional de Soria, is an annual cross country running competition that takes place in Soria, Spain. First held in 1994, it usually takes place in late November and gained IAAF cross country permit meeting status in 2007. It was previously a European Athletic Association permit meeting.

The competition features elite races of 10 km for men and 8 km for women. The men's and women's race had initially been competed over distances of 9 km and 6 km respectively, but the course lengths were increased in 2006. The course, known as the "Monte Valonsadero", was used in the early 1990s as a training ground by Fermín Cacho and Abel Antón, two of the region's foremost athletes. After inspecting the area, Miguel Ángel Pérez and Adolfo Caballero (members of the Athletics Delegation for Soria) suggested that a cross country meeting should be held there. It is a grassy course set in the Sorian countryside, and it is at a particularly high altitude – 1063 metres above sea level.

Many World Championship medallists have competed at the course, including Gebregziabher Gebremariam, Zersenay Tadese, Meselech Melkamu and Linet Masai. The meeting tends to be dominated by runners from East Africa and Spain. The high standard of runners that the meeting attracts means that the Cross Internacional de Soria is consistently ranked among the best cross country meetings in Spain by the Real Federación Española de Atletismo – the Spanish governing body for athletics.

Past senior race winners

References
General
Soria course profile . Real Federación Española de Atletismo. Retrieved on 2009-11-29.
Specific

External links
Official website

Cross country running competitions
Athletics competitions in Spain
Recurring sporting events established in 1994
Sport in Soria
Cross country running in Spain
Annual sporting events in Spain
1994 establishments in Spain